Shalmash Falls is a cluster of three waterfalls situated on the outskirts of the City of Sardasht in the West Azerbaijan province of Iran. Near the border with Iraq, they can be easily viewed from stairs built for visitors to these waterfalls. In addition to being a scenic site, their environs are used for recreation, including swimming. These falls are along a branch of the Little Zab River. In spring, this waterfall spends its most watery days. The weather of the region is cold until the middle of spring, but from the beginning of summer until the middle of autumn, it can be a good time to travel to this region.

References

Waterfalls of Iran
Landforms of West Azerbaijan Province